Helen Nissenbaum is professor of information science at Cornell Tech. She is best known for the concept of "contextual integrity" and her work on privacy, privacy law, trust, and security in the online world. Specifically, contextual integrity has influenced the United States government's thinking about privacy issues.

Early life and education

Nissenbaum studied mathematics and philosophy at the University of the Witwatersrand in South Africa, graduating in 1976. She then went on to study at Stanford University, where she completed a Master's in the social science of education in 1978, and a PhD in philosophy in 1983.

Work

Grants 
Nissenbaum has received grants from the National Science Foundation, Air Force Office of Scientific Research, Ford Foundation, the U.S. Department of Health and Human Services Office of the National Coordinator, and the Defense Advanced Research Projects Agency.

Browser extensions 
She has also contributed to several browser extensions for Firefox and Chrome. TrackMeNot was the first extension that she co-created in 2006. TrackMeNot uses the notion of privacy-through-obfuscation to protect the user against online identification, surveillance, and profiling. AdNauseam, created in 2009, follows a similar obfuscation strategy for online ads. Adnostic was created in 2013 to enable online ad targeting without compromising user's privacy.

Publications
Nissenbaum has written or edited a number of papers and books:

Honors and awards
 2014 Barwise Prize of the American Philosophical Association
 2017 honorary doctorate from the Leuphana University of Lüneburg
 2019 distinguished fellow of the Stanford Institute for Human-Centered Artificial Intelligence
2021 Covey Award of the International Association of Computing and Philosophy

References

External links
 
 
 

Living people
Year of birth missing (living people)
Scholars of privacy law
Computer law scholars
American philosophers
New York University faculty
Cornell Tech faculty
Stanford University alumni
University of the Witwatersrand alumni